Unguiculariella is a genus of fungi within the Hyaloscyphaceae family. This is a monotypic genus, containing the single species Unguiculariella bhutanica.

References

External links
Unguiculariella at Index Fungorum

Hyaloscyphaceae
Monotypic Leotiomycetes genera